The Akim Abuakwa South constituency is in the Eastern region of Ghana. The current member of Parliament for the constituency is Samuel Atta Akyea. He was elected  on the ticket of the New Patriotic Party (NPP) and  won a majority, with 5,046 votes more than candidate closest in the race, to win the constituency election to become the MP. He succeeded Nana Addo Dankwa Akufo-Addo who  had represented the constituency in the 4th Republic parliament on the ticket of the New Patriotic Party (NPP).

Members of Parliament

See also
List of Ghana Parliament constituencies

References

Parliamentary constituencies in the Eastern Region (Ghana)